Paul Wohl (1901 – April 2, 1985) was a German-born journalist and political commentator.

Background
Paul Wohl was born in 1901 in Berlin.

Career
In 1938, Wohl came to the United States as a correspondent for Czechoslovak newspapers.    He worked for the Christian Science Monitor from 1941 until 1979, when he retired.  He also contributed to the New York Herald Tribune, The Nation, Barron's, and Commonweal.

In the mid 1920s, Wohl met Soviet spy Walter Krivitsky.  Months after Krivitsky defected, Wohl  left Europe for the States and became Krivitsky's literary agent.  Wohl (and Isaac Don Levine as ghostwriter) helped the non-English-speaking Krivitsky write his memoir In Stalin's Secret Service (1939).  At the time of its publication, they argued about fees owed to Wohl and severed their connection.

Death
Paul Wohl died age 84 in April 1985 at St. Barnabas Hospital in the Bronx, after living three years at the Pelham Parkway Nursing Home.

See also
 Walter Krivitsky
 Isaac Don Levine

 Louis Waldman

References

External links

1901 births
1985 deaths
20th-century American journalists
20th-century American writers
German Marxists
German journalists
German male journalists
American male journalists
The Christian Science Monitor people
New York Herald Tribune people
German emigrants to the United States
German male writers